Coundon TT Football Club was an English amateur association football club based in the village of Coundon, County Durham.

Honours
Wearside League
Champions 1985–86
Runners-up 1983–84, 1987–88
Durham Challenge Cup
Winners - 1984, 1987

References

External links

Defunct football clubs in England
Association football clubs established in 1976
Association football clubs disestablished in 1991
1976 establishments in England
1991 disestablishments in England
Wearside Football League
Defunct football clubs in County Durham